Las tres viudas de papá ("The Three Widows of Father") is a 1942 Mexican comedy film directed by Miguel Zacarías. 
It stars Sara García. Produced by Manuel Sereijo, it was distributed by Grovas y Cía.

The film was one of three successive Zacarías comedies starring Chato Órtín and Sara García. 
It was the fourth sequel to Zacarías's Los enredos de papá, and maintained the same quality as the first three.
The others were Papá se desenreda and Papá se enreda otra vez.

The film premiered on 3 October 1942 in Mexico City.
It was included in the 1959 list of shows censored by the Mexican League of Decency.

Cast
Carolina Barret		
Antonio R. Frausto
Sara García	 		
Carlos López Moctezuma 		
Chel López 		
Miguel Montemayor 	 		
Leopoldo 'Chato' Ortín
Blanca Rosa Otero 		
Virginia Serret 		
Virginia Zurí

References

External links
 

1942 films
1940s Spanish-language films
1942 comedy films
Films directed by Miguel Zacarías
Mexican black-and-white films
Mexican comedy films
1940s Mexican films